Machaerium glabripes is a species of flowering plant in the family Fabaceae. It is found only in Panama.

References

glabripes
Flora of Panama
Vulnerable plants
Taxonomy articles created by Polbot